The signs of the appearance of the Mahdi are the collection of events, according to Islamic eschatology, that will occur before the arrival of the Mahdi, The signs differ based on Sunni and Shia branches of Islam.

Sunni signs 
Mahdi will be the last of the minor signs of the Judgement Day. Therefore all signs of the Judgement Day are also considered as the signs of the appearance of Mahdi.

Minor signs 

 The coming of fitna (tribulations) and removal of khushoo (fearfulness of God, reverence of God, etc.)
 A person passing by a grave might say to another the following: "I wish it were my abode."
 The loss of honesty, as well as authority put in the hands of those who do not deserve it.
 The loss of knowledge and the prevalence of religious ignorance.
 Frequent, sudden, and unexpected deaths.
 Increase in Al-Harj (pointless killings).
 Acceleration of time.
 Rejection of the Hadith.
 The spread of riba and zina and the drinking of alcohol.
 Widespread acceptance of music.
 Pride and competition in the decoration of mosques.
 Women will increase in number and men will decrease in number so much so that fifty women will be looked after by one man. 
 Abundance of earthquakes.
 Frequent occurrences of disgrace, distortion, public humiliation and defamation.
 When people wish to die because of the severe trials and tribulations that they are suffering.
 When paying charity becomes a burden.
 Nomads will compete in the construction of very tall buildings.
 Women will appear naked despite their being dressed.
 People will seek knowledge from misguided and straying scholars.
 Liars will be believed, honest people disbelieved, and faithful people called traitors.
 The death of righteous, knowledgeable people.
 The emergence of indecency (obscenity) and enmity among relatives and neighbours.
 The rise of idolatry and polytheists within the Ummah.
 The Euphrates will uncover a mountain of gold.
 The land of the Arabs will return to being a land of rivers and fields.
 People will increasingly earn money by unlawful (Haram) ways.
 There will be much rain but little vegetation.
 Evil people will be expelled from Medina.
 Wild animals will communicate with humans, and humans will communicate with objects.
 Lightning and thunder will become more prevalent.
 There will be a special greeting for people of distinction.
 Trade will become so widespread that a woman will help her husband in business.
 No truly honest man will remain and no one will be trusted.
 Only the worst people will be left; they will not know any good nor forbid any evil (i.e. No one will say there is no god but Allah).
 Nations will call each other to destroy Islam by any and every means.
 Islamic knowledge will be passed on, but no one will follow it correctly.
 Muslim rulers will come who do not follow the guidance and tradition of the Sunnah. Some of their men will have the hearts of devils in a human body.
 Stinginess will become more widespread and honorable people will perish.
 A man will obey his wife and disobey his mother, and treat his friend kindly while shunning his father.
 Voices will be raised in the mosques.
 The leader of a people will be the worst of them.
 People will treat a man with respect because they fear the evil he could do.
 Much wine will be drunk.
 Muslims shall fight against a nation who wear shoes made of hair and with faces like hammered shields, with red complexions and small eyes.
 The emergence of the Sufyani within the Syria region.
 The truce and joint Roman-Muslim campaign against a common enemy, followed by al-Malhama al-Kubra (Armageddon), a Roman vs. Muslim war.
 The Black Standard will come from Khorasan (see Hadith of black flags), nothing shall turn them back until it is planted in Jerusalem.
 Emergence of an army, from Yemen, that will make Islam dominant.
 An Arab king will die. There will be disagreement concerning succession. Then a man will emerge from Medina. He will hurry to Mecca, and the people of Mecca will come out to him and urge him and try to force him to accept the Bai'aa. One of the last of the lesser signs, and which will signal the coming of the 10 major signs is the appearance of the Mahdi.
 Solar eclipse in middles of the month of Ramadhan and lunar eclipse in the end of that month
Seeing fire in the sky
Successive wars and death of many people in the world
Creation and development of science and knowledge in Qom
Increasing injustice and corruption in the world
 All Islamic knowledge will be lost to the extent that people will not say "Lā ilāha illā llāh" (There is no god but Allah), but instead old people will babble without understanding, "God, God".
 People will fornicate on the roads "like donkeys".
 A pleasant breeze will blow from the south that shall cause all believers to die peacefully.

Shia signs
According to some narrations, there are five certain signs that will occur prior to the appearance of the Mahdi. The hadith of Ja'far al-Sadiq mentions these signs: "the appearance of Sufyani and Yamani, the loud cry in the sky, the murder of Nafs-e-Zakiyyah, and the earth swallowing (a group of people) in the land of Bayda which is a desert between Mecca and Medina.

Appearance of Sufyani 

According to some narrations Sufyani, one of the descendants of Abu Sufyan, will arise before Mahdi's appearance. He has been depicted as an outwardly devout man that will take care to remember Allah at all times. But in reality he will be the most wicked man in the world. He will upraise during the Rajab. After he realizes that Mahdi has appeared, he will send away an army to fight him. Some books say that the army of Sufyani before getting to the army of Mahdi will sink into the earth in the Bayda, a desert between Mecca and Medina. The appearance of Sufyani is mentioned in both Shia and Sunni narrations.

Appearance of Yamani 

In some narrations, the appearance of Yamani is mentioned as one of the certain signs of twelfth Imam's reappearance. The fifth Shia Imam, Muhammad al-Baqir, described Yamani in detail in a hadith:"... among these individuals (Sufyani, Yamani and Khorasani) the Yamani is the closest to guidance, for he calls the people to join the Mahdi. When he rises, the trading of weapons will be prohibited for every Muslim. When he rises, join him immediately, for his flag is the flag of guidance and prosperity and no Muslim should oppose it. Any one who does so will go to hell, because the Yamani calls to the right path." Some sources mention that the Yamani and the Khurasani will be allied against the Sufyani.

The loud cry in the sky 

The third certain sign that is mentioned in the above narration is the loud cry in the sky. According to tradition two cries will be heard. In the first of them Gabriel will call the name of Al-Qa'im and his father and say that truth is with Ali and his Shia. All people will hear Jibreel's cry in their own language. In a tradition of Ja'far al-Sadiq that is narrated by Zurarah ibn A'yan, it is said that after this cry Shaitan will call certainly, so and so and their followers are victorious ones and his meaning is a man from Banu Umayya. He adds that the person who make the first cry says the truth.

The murder of Nafs al-Zakiyyah 

Al-Nafs al-Zakiyyah will be one of the descendants of Husayn ibn Ali. He will be without any sin or crime; yet he will be murdered. According to many narrations, he will be the envoy of Mahdi to Mecca before his reappearance. When he arrives in Mecca and delivers his message, the people of Mecca will slay him near the Kaaba.

Earth sinking in the land of Bayda 

The sinking of Sufyani's army into the earth is a certain sign of reappearance of Mahdi. In addition to above-mentioned hadith of Ja'far Sadiq, in a hadith Ali ibn Abi Talib mentions that Sufyani's army will sink into the earth, and be swallowed up, in the land of Bayda.

See also 
 Mahdi
 Hadith of Isa ibn Maryam Praying Behind Mahdi

Notes

References

 
 
 
 
 
 
 
 
 
 
 
 
 
 

Islamic eschatology
Jesus in Islam